The Réserve de parc national de la Baie-aux-Feuilles (in English: Baie-aux-Feuilles National Park Reserve) is a protected area located in the administrative region of Nord-du-Québec, in Quebec, in Canada. It is also the only region where musk ox are found in Quebec.

See also 
 National Parks of Quebec
 Nunavik
 Rivière aux Feuilles, a stream

Notes and references 

Protected areas of Nord-du-Québec
National parks of Quebec
Nunavik